Headington was a rural district in Oxfordshire, England from 1894 to 1932, based on the Headington rural sanitary district. It covered an area to the east of the city of Oxford.  The parish of Headington was split out as a separate urban district in 1927.

It was abolished under a County Review Order in 1932.  Most went to form part of Bullingdon Rural District, with the parish of Horton cum Studley/Studley going to the new Ploughley Rural District.

References

External links
Headington Rural District boundary map – Vision of Britain website

History of Oxfordshire
Local government in Oxfordshire
Districts of England created by the Local Government Act 1894
Rural districts of England